The 1950 PGA Championship was the 32nd PGA Championship, held June 21–27 at Scioto Country Club in Upper Arlington, Ohio, a suburb northwest of Columbus. Chandler Harper won the match play championship, 4 & 3 over Henry Williams, Jr. in the Tuesday final; the winner's share was $3,500 and the runner-up's was $1,500. It was Harper's only major title; his next best finish in a major was a tie for eighth at the Masters in 1947.

Defending champion Sam Snead won $250 as the medalist in the stroke play qualifier at 140 (−4), but lost in the second round. He regained the title, his third, in 1951 at age 39.

The last three majors were held within several weeks in 1950. The U.S. Open was concluded less than two weeks earlier near Philadelphia where Ben Hogan defeated Lloyd Mangrum and George Fazio in an 18-hole playoff on Sunday, June 11. The British Open was played the first week of July in Scotland.

Format
The match play format at the PGA Championship in 1950 called for 12 rounds (216 holes) in seven days:
 Wednesday and Thursday – 36-hole stroke play qualifier, 18 holes per day;
defending champion Sam Snead and top 63 professionals advanced to match play
 Friday – first two rounds, 18 holes each
 Saturday – third round – 36 holes
 Sunday – quarterfinals – 36 holes
 Monday – semifinals – 36 holes
 Tuesday – final – 36 holes

Past champions in the field

Final results
Tuesday, June 27, 1950

Final eight bracket

Final match scorecards
Morning

Afternoon

Source:

References

External links
PGA Media Guide 2012
PGA.com – 1950 PGA Championship

PGA Championship
Golf in Ohio
Sports competitions in Columbus, Ohio
PGA Championship
PGA Championship
PGA Championship
PGA Championship